Glasow is an inhabited part of the Mahlow district of the municipality of Blankenfelde-Mahlow in the district of Teltow-Fläming in the state of Brandenburg, Germany.

Geographical position
This part of the commune is situated in the southeast of the Gemarkung. To the north lies the Mahlow district. This is followed clockwise by the Schönefeld district Selchow and the districts Groß Kienitz, Dahlewitz and Blankenfelde (each to Blankenfelde-Mahlow). Most of the district is built on and extends along the historical axis Alt Mahlow, which runs in a north–south direction through the former street village. In the center of the village there is a village green. In the south, the country road 75 branches off as Selchower Weg in an easterly direction and connects to the Bundesstraße 96, which also runs in a north–south direction. To the west, the Glasowbach flows past the village.

Economy and Infrastructure

Economy
In the place numerous crafts enterprises are active, under it several car dealers, a riding school as well as some service provider. There is a gas station, a food discounter and a hotel.

Traffic
The Alt Glasow street is the main connecting axis. It is crossed approximately in the middle of the district by Glasower Damm, which as Selchower Straße leads to the B 96 in an easterly direction. The RVS connects the village with Mahlow and Blankenfelde via the bus lines 742 and 794.

Blankenfelde-Mahlow
Localities in Teltow-Fläming